Michael Gaster FRS is a British aerospace engineer, and Professor of Experimental Aerodynamics, at City University, London.

Gaster was awarded the Ludwig-Prandtl-Ring from the Deutsche Gesellschaft für Luft- und Raumfahrt (German Society for Aeronautics and Astronautics) for "outstanding contribution in the field of aerospace engineering" in 2010.

References

External links
https://web.archive.org/web/20120426052518/http://www.researchpublications.qmul.ac.uk/publications/staff/19299.html

British aerospace engineers
Academics of Queen Mary University of London
Fellows of the Royal Society
Living people
Ludwig-Prandtl-Ring recipients
Engineering professors at the University of Cambridge
Year of birth missing (living people)
Fellows of the American Physical Society